Rathna Kumar is an Indian film director and writer. He is known for directing Meyaadha Maan (2017).

Career 
Kumar began his career with the low-budget film Madhu, which was included in an anthology film called Bench Talkies. He later turned the short film into a feature film titled Meyaadha Maan (2017). The film turned out to be a success and an important film in Vaibhav's career because the film was not a multistarrer and several of Vaibhav's successful films had only been multistarrers. He went on to direct Aadai (2019), starring Amala Paul. The film released to mixed reviews, but highlighted an important aspect of society. Kumar was signed as a co-writer to Lokesh Kanagaraj's Master. Regarding his decision of becoming a writer from a director, Kumar told The Times of India that Kanagaraj is his friend. Kumar started working with Lokesh again as a co-writer for Vijay's 67th film titled tentatively as  Leo co-starring Trisha, Janany, Azeem and Sanjay Dutt as villain in the film.

Filmography
All films are in Tamil, unless otherwise noted.

As director and writer

References

External links 

Living people
Film directors from Tamil Nadu
Screenwriters from Tamil Nadu
Indian film directors
Tamil film directors
Year of birth missing (living people)